Arabatuk (also given as Krasnyy Velikan North) is an air base in Russia located 38 km northeast of Daurija in the Zabaykalsky Krai region and  south east of Borzya.  It was a dispersal airfield for 189th Guards Brestskiy order of Suvorov Fighter-Bomber Aviation Regiment (Borzya-2).  During normal operations it remained idle (in caretaker status).

References

Soviet Air Force bases
Soviet Frontal Aviation
Russian Air Force bases